Epermenia turicola is a moth in the family Epermeniidae. It was described by Reinhard Gaedike in 2013. It is found in Kenya and Tanzania.

References

Epermeniidae
Moths described in 2013
Moths of Africa
Lepidoptera of Kenya
Lepidoptera of Tanzania